Dame Caroline Sydney  Arnott, DBE, OStJ, JP ( 
Williams; baptised 17 May 1859 – died 28 December 1933) was an English philanthropist.

Family
Arnott was born in Bath, Somerset, the daughter of Sir Frederick Williams, 2nd Baronet, 2nd Bt., of Tregullow in the County of Cornwall.

She married Major Sir John Alexander Arnott, 2nd Bt. (16 November 1853 – 26 July 1940), son of Sir John Arnott, 1st Bt. and Mary ( McKinlay), on 27 September 1881, publisher of the Irish Times. He held the office of Justice of the Peace (JP) for County Cork and of Deputy Lieutenant (DL) of County Cork.

She spent her married life in Dublin, where she was active in charitable causes, including raising £50,000  for an Irish War Memorial for the First World War.

Children
 Margaret Christian Salomé Arnott (1883 – 14 March 1952)
 Captain John Arnott (25 July 1885 – 30 March 1918) 
 Lina Victoria Arnott (1887 – 25 October 1974) 
 Mary Christian Arnott (1887 – 26 May 1936) 
 Sir Lauriston John Arnott, 3rd Bt. (27 November 1890 – 2 July 1958) 
 Sir Robert John Arnott, 4th Bt. (19 August 1896 – 25 July 1966) 
 Major Thomas John Arnott (12 April 1899 – 16 July 1979)

Investitures
She was invested as a Lady of Grace, Order of St John of Jerusalem (LGStJ). She held the office of Justice of the Peace (JP). In 1918, she was invested as a Dame Commander of the Order of the British Empire when she was vice president of the Soldiers and Sailors Help Society, Dublin, for her war work.

Death
Dame Caroline Arnott died on 28 December 1933 in Leicester. She was buried in Saint Fintan's Cemetery in Sutton, Dublin, Ireland.

References

Dames Commander of the Order of the British Empire
Ladies of Grace of the Order of St John
1859 births
1933 deaths
Daughters of baronets
English justices of the peace
People from Bath, Somerset
Irish justices of the peace